The United States Navy occupational rating of data processing technician (abbreviated as DP) was a designation given by the Bureau of Naval Personnel (BUPERS) to enlisted members who satisfactorily completed initial data processing technician "A" school training.

This navy rating originated as the machine accountant (MA) rating in large number of navy rating changes implemented in 1948. The rating name and designation was changed to data processing technician (DP) in 1967. The Navy disestablished the DP rating on 1 October 1997, combining DPs who had not previously changed ratings into the radioman (RM) rating. In 1999 the (RM) rating was re-designated information systems technician (IT). The radioman rating specialty mark was retained for use by the IT rating members. In 2005 the cryptologic technician communications (CTO) rating merged into the IT rating.

Data processing technicians operated data processing equipment including keypunch machines, sorters, collators, reproducers, tabulating printers, and computers; performed the administrative tasks for operating computer facility, including the handling of all classified material passing into or out of a computer system; designed, developed, tested, and maintained computer software.

See also 
 List of United States Navy ratings
 Navy Data Processor's Association Page

United States Navy ratings
Data processing